In mathematics, in particular in functional analysis, the Rademacher system, named after Hans Rademacher, is an incomplete orthogonal system of functions on the unit interval of the following form:

 

The Rademacher system is stochastically independent, and is closely related to the Walsh system. Specifically, the Walsh system can be constructed as a product of Rademacher functions.

References

External links
 Rademacher system in the Encyclopedia of Mathematics

Functional analysis